Fulcuich (Fulcois) Count of Mortagne, son of Rotrou, Seigneur de Nogent.  It has been conjectured that Fulcuich's ancestor was Hervé I, Lord of Mortagne-au-Perche, through his supposed mother, Hildegarde de Mortagne et Perche, wife of Rotrou, who is a known daughter of Hervé.

Fulcuich married Melisende, Viscountess of Châteaudun, daughter of Hugues, Viscount of Châteaudun, and Hildegarde of Perche. Fulcuich and Melisende had two children:
 Geoffrey II Viscount of Châteaudun, I Count of Perche.
 Hugues du Perche

Fulcuich was presumably succeeded as count by his son Geoffrey.

Sources 
Kerrebrouck, Patrick van, Nouvelle histoire généalogique de l'auguste maison de France, vol. 1: La Préhistoire des Capétiens. 1993.

Medieval Lands Project, Vicomtes de Châteaudun

Reuter, Timothy (Editor), The New Cambridge Medieval History, Volume III, 900-1024, Cambridge University Press, 1999

Medieval French nobility
11th-century French people